Armorika is the eighth studio album by the German electronic composer Peter Frohmader, released independently in 1991.

Track listing

Personnel 
Adapted from the Armorika liner notes.
 Petra Fierlbeck – vocals
 Peter Frohmader – electric guitar, acoustic twelve-string guitar, Chapman Stick, sampler, synthesizer, musical arrangement
 Richard Kurländer – harp, dulcimer
 Stephan Manus – violin

Release history

References 

1991 albums
Peter Frohmader albums